Abbabiya 'Biya' Simbassa (born June 30, 1993) is an Ethiopian-born American long-distance runner. He competed collegiately for the Oklahoma Sooners after spending two years at Iowa Central Community College. He now competes for Under Armour. He won the 2017 and 2019 NACAC Cross Country Championships. In 2021, he won the USA 10-mile run championships and 25K championships.

Personal bests
Outdoor
1500 metres – 3:39.88 (Portland 2021)
Mile – 3:58.71 (Raleigh 2021)
3000 metres – 7:48.55 (Phoenix 2021)
5000 metres – 13:19.12 (San Juan Capistrano 2021)
10,000 metres – 27:45.78 (Palo Alto 2021)
Road
5K – 13:58 (New York City 2021)
10K – 28:39 (Charleston 2021)
15K – 43:22 (Jacksonville 2022)
10 miles – 46:18 (Washington, D.C. 2022)
20K – 59:19 (New Haven 2022)
Half marathon – 1:00:37 (Valencia 2022)
25K – 1:14:27 (Grand Rapids 2021)
Indoor
Mile – 4:06.38 (College Station 2014)
3000 metres – 8:04.44 (Fayetteville 2015)
5000 metres – 13:46.97 (Boston 2019)

References

1993 births
Living people
American male long-distance runners
Ethiopian male long-distance runners
Ethiopian emigrants to the United States
Oklahoma Sooners men's track and field athletes